Keith Bruce Campbell QC (25 October 1916 – 1990) was a British lawyer, judge and politician. As a barrister, he specialised in divorce law, and during a brief Parliamentary career he also concentrated on family law issues. His term in office as a judge ended in scandal and enforced removal from office.

Early life
Campbell was born in Christchurch, New Zealand and attended Christchurch Technical College and Canterbury University. He moved to London in the late 1930s to undertake postgraduate training at the University of London. When his course was over in 1941 he was given an officer's commission in the Royal Army Service Corps; he served in North Africa and Italy.

Legal career
On demobilisation Campbell was called to the bar at the Inner Temple. He practised in divorce law, usually on the North-Western circuit, and served on the General Council of the Bar from 1956 to 1960 and from 1965 to 1970. He was made a Queen's Counsel in 1964.

By-election candidate
An active member of the Conservative Party, Campbell fought the seat of Manchester Gorton at the 1955 general election. He fought Oldham West in the 1966 election, and when the sitting Labour MP Leslie Hale announced his retirement due to ill health, Campbell was a natural choice for the local Conservative Association. The byelection campaign took place at a time when the Labour government of Harold Wilson was unpopular and Campbell criticised the government for cutting back on the motorway programmes and for their incomes policy. Many senior Conservatives travelled to Oldham to support Campbell, as a victory was thought possible.

Parliament
When the constituency polled on 13 June 1968, Campbell managed a 17.7% swing and won the seat with a majority of 3,311. His maiden speech on 1 November concentrated on the problem of housing in his constituency. He was lucky in the ballot for Private Members' Bills later that month and introduced a Bill to award state pensions to some widows who did not qualify due to insufficient National Insurance payments. Using his legal experience, Campbell attacked divorce reform for allowing men to take advantage of their own wrong; he supported the idea of consensual divorce without the need to prove fault.

Judicial career
Campbell lost his seat at the 1970 general election by 1,675 votes, and returned to the Bar (he had practised occasionally while a Member of Parliament). He was Master of the Bench of the Inner Temple in that year, and two years later was appointed a Recorder of the Crown Court. In January 1976, Campbell's sentence of a 31-year-old mother of a two-month-old baby to six months' imprisonment was attacked by the mother's MP Robert Kilroy-Silk. Despite the controversy, Campbell became a Circuit Judge later that year.

Scandal
In 1983, Campbell's motor cruiser Papyrus was detained at Ramsgate by Customs, who removed 10 cases of whisky, 9,460 cigarettes and 500 grams of tobacco on which duty had not been paid. Campbell and the yacht's joint owner (a secondhand car dealer) were tried for evading duty; when initially questioned Campbell claimed he had not brought the goods into the country and that they were only for his personal use, but he later admitted that they had been bought in Guernsey. On 29 November he pleaded guilty and was fined £2,000; on 5 December the Lord Chancellor Lord Hailsham removed him from office for misbehaviour, an unprecedented sanction. There was a political row when Hailsham allowed Campbell to keep his judge's pension.

He died in Canterbury, Kent in 1990 aged 75.

Campbell's older son Andrew followed the legal profession and has been a Circuit Judge since 2004. Campbell's younger son Richard is the British actor Richard Campbell.

References

The Times
M. Stenton and S. Lees, "Who's Who of British MPs" Vol. IV (Harvester Press, 1981)
"The Times Guide to the House of Commons 1970"

External links 
 

20th-century English judges
Conservative Party (UK) MPs for English constituencies
UK MPs 1966–1970
Royal Army Service Corps officers
1916 births
1990 deaths
People from Christchurch
Alumni of the University of London
Politics of the Metropolitan Borough of Oldham
University of Canterbury alumni
Members of the Inner Temple
British Army personnel of World War II
20th-century King's Counsel
New Zealand emigrants to the United Kingdom